Dune is a German electronic group known for songs such as "Hardcore Vibes", "Can't Stop Raving", "Are You Ready to Fly" and "Rainbow to the Stars".

History 
The group was founded in 1995 by DJ Oliver Froning and producers Jens Oettrich and Bernd Burhoff (alias Plutone). The band's name was inspired by the science fiction film Dune, based on Frank Herbert's novel of the same name. They released "Hardcore Vibes", a largely instrumental track containing spoken words by Froning's niece, and a cover version of Rozalla's song "Are You Ready to Fly" as their first two singles, followed in mid-1995 by the group's eponymous debut album, released at Urban Records. An instrumental track from the album, "Can't Stop Raving", became the third single, augmented with heavily pitched-up vocals by singer Tina Lagao. All three singles reached the Swiss German and Dutch charts. Early in 1996, dancer Verena von Strenge became the group's main singer. The second album Expedicion, released the same year, spawned the singles "Rainbow to the Stars", "Hand in Hand", and "Million Miles from Home". The latter was Germany's anthem of the 30th anniversary of Star Trek.

In early 1997, Dune made a drastic change in musical style. Accompanied by the London Philharmonic Orchestra, the band produced a cover of Queen's "Who Wants to Live Forever", reaching second place in the German charts. They released a new album, Forever, with the cover of Phil Collins hit "Against All Odds", Sinéad O'Connor's hit "Nothing Compares 2 U" and Frankie Goes to Hollywood's "The Power of Love", but disagreements led to Verena von Strenge's departure.

The single "Keep the Secret", released on 20 April 1998, saw the debut of a new vocalist, Vanessa Hörster. The video of the track "Electric Heaven" was directed by Eric Will and shot on the Côte d'Azur in France. Both singles failed commercially, leading to the album 5, planned for release in August 1998, being cancelled. Another classical album, Forever and Ever, recorded together with the London Philharmonic Orchestra and previous vocalist Tina Lagao (performing here under the artist name 'Tina Lacebal'), was released on 23 November 1998 but flopped commercially.

At the end of 1999, the group reunited with Verena von Strenge and released the single "Dark Side of the Moon", which reached 49 on the German charts. The group began recording songs for an album titled Reunion.
Dune recorded "Heaven", a cover version of A7's 1999 hit "Piece of Heaven", under the (false) impression that they had obtained permission of the original artist. However, prior to the single's release, A7 lodged a court order, alleging plagiarism. Dune were forced to cancel the release of "Heaven", and they could not release their album Reunion due to the court order. Songs that had already been recorded for the Reunion album, except for "Heaven", were later released on the album History. After remakes of "Hardcore Vibes" (2000) and "Rainbow to the Stars" (2003), the group quietly disbanded.

Oliver Froning later continued as a solo artist using the Dune moniker and since after 2014, frequently appeared as a DJ. In 2016, he released "Magic Carpet Ride", with vocals by Kate Wild. Froning's use of the Dune moniker is currently the subject of a legal dispute between him and Burhoff.

In 2017, the single "Starchild (First Contact – Chapter One)" was released, followed by "Utopia", "We're Alive" and "Turn the Tide" in 2018.

Members 
 Oliver Froning (1995–present)
 Jens Oettrich (1995–2003)
 Bernd Burhoff (1995–2003)
 Verena von Strenge (1996–1997, 1999–2000)
 Vanessa Hörster (1997–1998)
 Tina Lacebal (1995–1996, 1998)

Discography

Albums

Singles

References

External links 

Fan website
Fan website (in English)
Dune at Danceartistinfo.com
The story behind the cancellation of Reunion
 

Musical groups established in 1995
Musical groups disestablished in 2000
German techno musicians
Happy hardcore musicians
Hardcore techno musicians
People from Münster